Vacuolar protein sorting-associated protein 33A is a protein that in humans is encoded by the VPS33A gene.

Function 

Vesicle mediated protein sorting plays an important role in segregation of intracellular molecules into distinct organelles. Genetic studies in yeast have identified more than 40 vacuolar protein sorting (VPS) genes involved in vesicle transport to vacuoles. This gene is a member of the Sec-1 domain family, and it encodes a protein similar to the yeast class C Vps33 protein. The mammalian class C VPS proteins are predominantly associated with late endosomes/lysosomes, and like their yeast counterparts, may mediate vesicle trafficking steps in the endosome/lysosome pathway.

Interactions 

VPS33A has been shown to interact with VPS11.

Clinical 

A syndrome has been described that appears to be associated with mutations in this gene. This syndrome has since been named Mucopolysaccharidosis-plus syndrome.

References

Further reading